Amaziah or Amasias (in the Douay-Rheims translation) ("strengthened by God") may refer to:

 Amaziah of Judah, the king of Judah
 A Levite, son of Hilkiah, of the descendants of Ethan the Merarite (1 Chronicles 6:45)
 Amaziah (Book of Amos), a priest of the golden calves at Bethel (Amos 7:10-17)
 The father of Joshah, one of the leaders of the tribe of Simeon in the time of Hezekiah (1 Chr. 4:34)

Set index articles on Hebrew Bible people
Unisex given names